Steven G. Farrell (born 1954 in Kenosha, Wisconsin) is the author of Mersey Boys, a novel, play and screenplay. The three books were published in 2013 by Celtic-Badger Publishers.  Mersey Boys is about an American art professor, Al Moran, moving to Liverpool, England in 1959, where he encounters a rebellious student by the name of John Lennon. Moran and Lennon clash in the classroom and over Ginny Browne, a beautiful but independent woman. Gradually Lennon, Moran and Browne merge into a friendship that leads to the forming of the Beatles. The filming of Mersey Boys was announced by La Muse Venale Theatre in 2013 and was to be filmed exclusively in Manhattan, Brooklyn and Staten Island by director M. Stefan Strozier. Strozier struggled to complete the work and 58 minutes of the "Unfinished Mersey Boys Film" was put up on YouTube in March 2016 in three parts.

Greenville Technical College did a stage reading on Mersey Boy in March 2016, starring Dan Robbins as Moran, Nick Heredia as Lennon and Erin Kathleen Shealy as Browne. Paddy Murphy and Celtic Badger of Limerick, Ireland agreed to be the filmmakers for Mersey Boys.

In June 2017 Paddy Murphy, director of the film "The Three Don'ts,"  gave an interview to Crypt Magazine in which he announced his intention of working in collaboration with Farrell on the "Mersey Boys" project by the end of the year.

Paddy Murphy and Barry Fahy of Celtic Badger Media Films announced the filming of "A Letter From Al Moran," based on the "Mersey Boys on a podcast from Limerick, Ireland on October 22, 2017.  The two interviewed author Steven G. Farrell and actor Rachel Cobb. Farrell played the part of Gerard Moran and Cobb played the part of Moira Moran. They shot in Galway on October 21, 2017. Jessica Messenger, an English actor from Manchester, England, agreed to fly to Ireland to play the female lead of Ginny Browne. A cast and crew of fifteen people spent twelve hours shouting on October 28, 2017, including Messenger, Fiach Kunz as Professor Al Moran, Robert Bourke as John Lennon, Mikey Casey as Paul McCartney, Ben Collope as George Harrison,  Rachel Cobb as Moira Moran, Grahan Gill as Squire Clancy, and Steven G. Farrell as Gerard Moran. "A Letter From Al Moran" will be entered into the 2018 Cannes Film Festival in France.

Publications

References

1954 births
Living people
American male writers
21st-century American writers
Writers from Greenville, South Carolina